The Islamabad Marriott Hotel bombing occurred on the night of 20 September 2008, when a dumper truck filled with explosives was detonated in front of the Marriott Hotel in the Pakistani capital Islamabad, killing at least 54 people, injuring at least 266 and leaving a 60 ft (20 m) wide, 20 ft (6 m) deep crater outside the hotel. The majority of the casualties were Pakistanis; at least five foreign nationals were also killed and fifteen others reported injured. The attack occurred only hours after President Asif Ali Zardari made his first speech to the Pakistani parliament.
The Marriott was the most prestigious hotel in the capital, and was located near government buildings, diplomatic missions, embassies and high commissions.

During the investigation, three suspected terrorists were arrested by the Pakistani police. They were suspected of having facilitated the suicide bomber. However later they were acquitted of all charges as no evidence was ever presented against them.

A few months after the hotel's bombing the Government of Pakistan had re-constructed it, and the Islamabad Marriott reopened officially on 28 December 2008.

Attack

The hotel blast caused a severe natural gas leak that set the top floor of the five-story, 258-room hotel on fire, police said. The explosion was heard 15 kilometres away. The blaze that followed quickly engulfed the entire structure of the Marriott hotel. About two-thirds of the building caught fire as a result of the explosion after a natural gas pipe was blown open, and the reception area was completely destroyed.

The owner of the Marriott Hotel, Hashoo Group, owned by Sadruddin Hashwani, said the truck carrying the bomb had been stopped at the front barrier. "Some shots were fired. One of our guards fired back, and in the meantime the suicide bomber detonated all the explosives. All the guards on the gate died", said Hashwani.

Victims

Most of the dead were Pakistani citizens; several foreigners were also killed. Two American military personnel and a Danish intelligence agent were killed, and a U.S. State Department employee was missing and presumed dead. The Czech ambassador to Pakistan, Dr. Ivo Žďárek, also died in the ensuing fire along with his Vietnamese companion. Although Žďárek had survived the initial blast, he returned to the hotel to help in the rescue effort but was trapped in the burning building. An Egyptian citizen also died in the attack. In addition, six Germans, four Britons and a Filipina receptionist from the hotel were among the injured.

Meeting of the Pakistani leadership
Pakistan's top leaders were to have been in the Islamabad Marriott hotel when it was bombed; instead, having changed their plans at the last minute, they gathered for dinner at the Prime Minister's house, a few hundred yards from the explosion, following President Asif Ali Zardari's maiden address to a joint session of parliament. "The national assembly speaker had arranged a dinner for the entire leadership – for the president, prime minister and armed services chiefs – at the Marriott that day", the Interior ministry head, Rehman Malik, told reporters.

However, the hotel owner, Sadruddin Hashwani, denied that such a meeting had ever been scheduled to take place. According to a spokesman for Hashwani, "We didn't have any reservation for such a dinner that the government official is talking about."

Pakistani Interior Minister Rehman Malik said both Zardari and Prime Minister Yousaf Raza Gilani condemned the attack and vowed their determination to deal with terrorism, with Law Minister Farooq Naek stating "this is Pakistan's 9/11".

Explosives used
Government advisor Rehman Malik said RDX and TNT were used in the attack. Approximately  of RDX was mixed with TNT (Torpex or H6) and a mixture of mortar and ammunition to increase the explosive capacity. Aluminium powder was also mixed with the material to further enhance this capability. Torpex is about 50 percent more powerful than TNT by weight. The blast was heard for many miles throughout the capital.

"Delay switches" might also have been used. Guards were first alerted by a minor blast, which was followed by the much larger explosion about four minutes later.

Video of the attack

The Pakistani government released the CCTV footage of the attack at a press conference saying that a six-wheeled dumper truck filled with explosives and an accelerant pulled up at the gate and first caught fire before exploding a few minutes later.

Hashwani claim
Sadruddin Hashwani, the owner of Islamabad Marriott Hotel, alleged that President Asif Ali Zardari might have been involved in the attack, citing his old rivalry with the President.

American presence
An unnamed senior security official stated that about 30 U.S. Marines, scheduled to go to Afghanistan, were staying at the hotel, and they were believed to have been the targets of the bombing. This conflicted with information given by another unnamed official, who stated that the Marines were in Pakistan in connection with the visit by U.S. Chairman of the Joint Chiefs of Staff, Admiral Mike Mullen, who met the Pakistani Prime Minister Yousaf Raza Gillani and other government officials on Wednesday. The personnel were staying on the fourth floor of the hotel, which was also among the most severely damaged by the fire which ensued following the bomb blast. According to the Dawn, a number of the marines who stayed at the hotel sustained injuries; the newspaper also cited an unnamed law enforcement official stating "personnel of a U.S. security agency" were in all likelihood a target of the attack. There are also reports that more Americans were present at the hotel, as several senior CIA officers were visiting Islamabad at the time of the attack and were believed to be staying at the hotel, according to unnamed "well placed sources". A 29 May 2009 press release from NSA reads: CTM3 Matthew J. O'Bryant, USN, a Navy Cryptologist, was assigned to Navy Information Operations Command (NIOC) Maryland. CTM3 O'Bryant made the ultimate sacrifice on 20 September 2008 while performing a cryptologic mission in Pakistan. The hotel has a direct line of sight to the telecom system in Islamabad Pakistan.
The other American service member killed was Major Rodolfo Ivan Rodriguez, USAF. Major Rodriguez was doing work for the US Embassy and staying at the Marriott at the time of the attack.

Claims of American marines breaching security
An MP for the ruling Pakistan Peoples Party, Syed Mumtaz Alam Gillani, has come forward with testimony evidencing a purportedly serious security breach at the Marriott on the night between 16 and 17 September, several days before the bombing. Alam Gillani and two friends are said to have witnessed several large steel boxes being unloaded from a U.S. Embassy truck by a group of U.S. Marines and, according to someone at the hotel, transported to the fourth and fifth floors. Among the several people who witnessed this incident was Pakistan Peoples Party leader Sajjad Chaudhry.

However, Alam Gilani was the only one who objected to and protested the apparent security breach taking place, but was met with silence from the American Marines. The hotel security staff did not respond to Alam Gilani's protests as they passively watched what was taking place, not being allowed to go near the boxes by the U.S. Marines. Alam Gilani has since denounced the newspaper account, asserting that he was merely making light conversation with the journalist; the newspaper, however, stands by its account. Pakistani authorities are also investigating this issue.

The American Embassy has said that it routinely rents rooms at the Marriott. Confronted with the activities of the U.S. Marines on the night of 16/17 September, embassy spokesperson Lou Fintor stated: "A team of support personnel often and routinely precede and/or accompany certain U.S. government officials. They often carry communication and office equipment required to support large delegations, such as high-level administration officials and members of the U.S. Congress." However, the incident occurred after Admiral Mullen's departure.

Consequences
President Asif Ali Zardari was considering delaying his visit to the US to attend the UN General Assembly session in the wake of the bombing. MP Ayaz Amir said that he felt that the president should cancel his visit given the circumstances, and instead should combat terrorism and extremism. He added, "I believe that the UN General Assembly annual session is the most useless event in the world where leaders go to listen to their own speeches." However, Zardari did make it to New York for the opening of the new session of the General Assembly.

Due to the attack, British Airways suspended flights to Islamabad as a precautionary measure "until further notice." British Airways did not resume flights until June 2019 a decade later. American schools and universities in Islamabad closed for the rest of that week as well.

Terror pledge
The BBC reported that Pakistan was an important ally of the United States in its "war on terror", but that it had disagreements over tactics and had complained about US raids from Afghanistan. Following an apparent power vacuum as a result of the stepping down of former president Pervez Musharraf earlier in the month, U.S. missile-strikes had increased, culminating in the Baghar Cheena airstrike on 17 September.
After the event, president Asif Ali Zardari appealed for "all democratic forces" to help to save Pakistan and he pledged to rid Pakistan of Islamic militants: "Terrorism is a cancer in Pakistan, we are determined, God willing, we will rid the country of this cancer. I promise you that such actions by these cowards will not lower our resolve." Pakistan's chief adviser on internal security, Rehman Malik, said "the authorities would fight on until the last terrorist is cleared. We think that the safe Pakistan, safe Afghanistan is safety for the world and therefore we will not let them have easy way."

Possible perpetrators
A Taliban spokesperson denied the group's involvement in the blast, saying they "do not believe in killing so many locals."

An American intelligence official stated that the attack "bears all the hallmarks of a terrorist operation carried out by Al Qaeda or its associates."

Some investigators suspect another Islamist group, Harkat-ul-Jihad-al-Islami, was responsible for the attack, based upon the similarities between this incident and four previous attacks allegedly conducted by its operatives.

Dubai-based Arabiya Television says a group calling itself Fedayeen Islam (also spelled Fedayan-i-Islam), variously translated as "Islamic Commandos" or "Islamic Patriots" has called Arabiya's correspondent in the Pakistani capital, Islamabad. The correspondent said he received a text message on his mobile phone, showing a telephone number. He said he called the number and then heard a recording in which the group admitted launching Saturday's attack. The Arabiya television correspondent says the speaker spoke in English language with a South Asian accent. The Fedayeen Islam group has issued several demands including for Pakistan to stop its cooperation with the United States.

U.S. airstrike

On 1 January 2009 a missile fired from an unmanned aerial vehicle killed al-Qaeda's chief of operations for Pakistan, Fahid Mohammed Ally Msalam, and his aide, Sheikh Ahmed Salim Swedan. U.S. officials stated that they believed that al-Kini masterminded the hotel bombing.

Legal Issues
Represented by Miami-based attorney Andrew C. Hall and a Maryland attorney, Jonathan A. Azrael, the family of an American killed in the blast sued Marriott for negligence in federal court in Maryland in 2011.

Fund
The "Islamabad Marriott Assistance Fund" was started by the owner of the hotel as the blast and resulting fires killed about 40 hotel staff, including the security guards who had tried to avert the disaster, while scores of other employees were also wounded.

Sadruddin Hashwani said: "We have set up a fund to cater for the future expenses of the families of employees either killed or wounded in the attack." He announced that he would make an initial donation of US$126,000 to the fund, and appealed for people to donate generously.

The Marriott International and The J. Willard and Alice S. Marriott Foundation also made contributions to the fund, established through United Way to provide financial assistance to the associates and their families affected by the tragedy.

Investigation
A panel that the government had formed, consisting of police officials and experts from security agencies to probe the attack, presented a preliminary report to the Prime Minister. The Interior Secretary Syed Kamal Shah also admitted to the Senate's Standing Committee on his ministry that the blast was the result of a defective security system. He added that the Islamabad police chief has said intelligence agencies had informed the police about an explosives-laden vehicle entering the city to carry out an attack.

Three suspected terrorists Mohammed Aqeel (possibly Dr. Usman), Rana Ilyas and Hameed Afzal were arrested in Peshawar on 17 October by the Pakistani police with connection to the attack were remanded to police custody for 7 days on 18 October for questioning by an anti-terrorism court. They were suspected of having facilitated the suicide bomber. In requesting the court for a 10-day remand, the police also said they hoped to arrest more suspects with information from the three. Judge Sakhi Muhammad Kahut, who remanded the trio to police custody, also ordered police to produce them in court again on 24 October.

A man by the name of Dr. Usman, possibly the same individual, was involved in the attack on the Sri Lanka national cricket team and the raid against the Pakistani Army Headquarters.

Police said that Qari Ishtiaq, who is said to be the commander of Punjabi Taliban, was arrested from Bahawalpur on the information provided by the Hijratullah who has been jailed for 10 years due to his role in Lahore police academy attacks. Seven other militants were arrested from different parts of Punjab regions. Four hundred kilograms (880 lb) of explosives were also seized from Qari Ishtiaq.

On 5 May 2010, Mohammed Aqeel, Rana Ilyas, Muhammad Hamid Afzal and Tahseen Ullah were acquitted of all charges as no evidence was ever presented against them.

International reactions

Intergovernmental organizations

State entities

Other non-state entities

See also

List of terrorist incidents, 2008
War in North-West Pakistan
Pan AM Karachi

References

External links 

Statement on the Explosion at the Islamabad Marriott Hotel – Marriott.com – Bill Marriott's blog entry about the hotel disaster
Islamabad Marriott Hotel

2008 murders in Pakistan
Marriott Hotel bombing
21st-century mass murder in Pakistan
Attacks on buildings and structures in Pakistan
Attacks on hotels in Asia
Attacks on tourists
Marriott Hotel bombing
Filmed improvised explosive device bombings
Marriott International
Mass murder in 2008
Marriott Hotel bombing
September 2008 crimes
September 2008 events in Asia
Suicide bombings in 2008
Suicide car and truck bombings in Pakistan
Marriott hotel bombing
Terrorist incidents in Pakistan in 2008
Building bombings in Pakistan
Hotel bombings